Robert Sirianni (born October 31, 1983) is a retired Canadian-born Italian professional ice hockey player. 

He played with the HC Pustertal and HC Valpellice of the Serie A. Sirianni competed in the 2012 IIHF World Championship as a member of the Italy men's national ice hockey team.

References

External links

1983 births
Living people
Ice hockey people from Edmonton
Italian ice hockey players
Bonnyville Pontiacs players
Wheeling Nailers players
Canadian ice hockey right wingers
Bemidji State Beavers men's ice hockey players
Syracuse Crunch players
Binghamton Senators players
Philadelphia Phantoms players
Youngstown Steelhounds players
Utah Grizzlies (ECHL) players